Abie "Available" Baker  Leslie Robert Baker; 28 September 1913, in South Bend, Indiana – 14 February 1993, in Harlem) was an American session musician, arranger, and bandleader who played double bass on jazz, R&B, and pop recordings in New York City, from 1934 through the early 1960s. His credits have been chronicled under the names Abe Baker (rarely), Abie Baker (mostly), and Abie "Available" Baker.

Career 
As New York session bassist in jazz from 1934 to 1960, he recorded with Blanche Calloway, Snub Mosley, Herman Chittison, Joey Thomas, Titus Turner and the Howard Biggs Orchestra, Dosie Terry, John Greer, George James  and the Howard Biggs Orchestra, Johnny Hartman and the Howard Biggs Orchestra, Jimmy "Baby Face" Lewis, Hadda Brooks, Melvin Smith (vocalist), The Du-Droppers, Annie Laurie, Larry Darnell, Ethel Ennis, Jimmy Tyler, Bobbie and Ronald (vocalists), Varetta Dillard, Cootie Williams, Bill Doggett, Little Willie John, Ruth Brown, King Curtis, LaVern Baker, Big Joe Turner, Teddy Humphries, Little Jimmy Scott, and  Baby Boy Jennings & The Satellites.

Around 1936, he was a member of Claude Hopkins' touring orchestra.

By 1949, he had started recording in New York with his own trio and singer Richie Cannon (previously of The Ravens).

As New York session bassist in R&B during the 1950s, he recorded for labels that included Savoy and Atlantic with Sister Rosetta Tharpe, Marie Knight, Hadda Brooks, Nappy Brown, Big Maybelle, The Coasters, and The Drifters.  He also played on the banned 1957 album My Pussy Belongs to Daddy, credited to Faye Richmonde.

In filmography, Baker, in 1959, performed on "The Web", an instrumental released on the small Laurel label which was later used as part of the score for the camp horror movie The Brain That Wouldn't Die.

In June 1965, Baker established two record labels, Internationale and Forest Green, both in New York. He also established publishing companies.  With Johnny Worlds, he established and headed Worlds-Baker Enterprises, covering several record labels, publishing, marketing and distribution.

Family 
Some sources state that he was the father of guitarist Mickey Baker, with whom he played on sessions during the 1950s, but this conflicts with other sources about Mickey Baker's parentage.

Discography

With Bill Doggett
Doggett Beat for Dancing Feet (King, 1957)

References

American jazz double-bassists
1913 births
1993 deaths